Gyromantis is genus of praying mantises represented by two species of bark mantis:
Gyromantis kraussi (spiny bark mantis)
Gyromantis occidentalis (eastern bark mantis)

See also
List of mantis genera and species

References

Insects of Australia
Mantodea genera
Nanomantidae